Don't Go Alone is a 1989 video game published by Accolade.

Gameplay
Don't Go Alone is a game in which the players go through ten levels of an old house filled with monsters, with the objective of finding and killing the Ancient One.

Reception
Scorpia reviewed the game for Computer Gaming World, and stated that "the game is mainly an exercise in monster-mash, although on a more limited scale than most CRPG's. The simple interface, very nice auto-mapping, balanced combat, interesting monster graphics, formula components, and unique use of fear are all pluses, but these are overshadowed by the large minus of having little substantive to do in the game. Essentially, this game is best for those with little or no experience with CRPG's."

Reviews
The Games Machine - Feb, 1990

References

External links
Review in Compute!

1980s horror video games
1989 video games
DOS games
DOS-only games
Role-playing video games
Video games developed in the United States